Robert Marion Sayre (August 18, 1924 – March 31, 2016) was a United States State Department official and ambassador to Brazil, Panama and Uruguay. A career foreign service officer specializing in Latin American affairs, Sayre served as the United States Ambassador to Uruguay from 1968 to 1969, Ambassador to Panama from 1969 to 1974, and Ambassador to Brazil from 1978 to 1981. He also held the position of Inspector General of the U.S. State Department from 1974 to 1978.

Early life
He was born in Hillsboro, Oregon, on August 18, 1924. He served in the United States Army from 1942 to 1946, during World War II. In 1949, Sayre earned a bachelor's degree from Willamette University in Salem, Oregon, followed by  master's degree in 1960 from Stanford University. He then graduated from George Washington University Law School with a JD in 1956.

Career
Sayre started at the State Department in 1949 as an intern. He then worked his way up in the State Department, serving in various roles. These included serving on the United States Security Council from 1964 to 1965, as the Deputy Assistant Secretary for the Bureau of Inter-American Affairs from 1965 to 1967, and then as Assistant Secretary for Inter-American Affairs from 1967 to 1968. He served as the U.S. ambassador to Uruguay from 1968 to 1969, and to Panama from 1969 to 1974. On February 9, 1978, President Jimmy Carter nominated Sayre to serve as the ambassador to Brazil. Sayre served as ambassador to Brazil from 1978 to 1981, followed by United States Coordinator for Counterterrorism from 1982 to 1984. He also served as the Inspector General of the Foreign Service.

Sayre died on March 31, 2016, in Fairfax, Virginia, at the age of 91.

References

External links
American Academy of Diplomacy

|-

|-

1924 births
2016 deaths
Ambassadors of the United States to Brazil
Ambassadors of the United States to Panama
Ambassadors of the United States to Uruguay
United States Army personnel of World War II
George Washington University Law School alumni
People from Hillsboro, Oregon
Stanford University alumni
United States Army soldiers
United States Department of State officials
United States Foreign Service personnel
Willamette University alumni